"Train Wreck" is a song by the British singer James Arthur from his 2016 album Back from the Edge. On 28 October 2020, four years later, an acoustic version was released after the song went viral on the video-sharing platform TikTok, which had led to it entering the top 20 of the UK Singles Chart.

Charts

Weekly charts

Year-end charts

Certifications

References

2016 songs
Songs written by James Arthur
James Arthur songs
Songs written by Adam Argyle